Elaiochori, is a village and part of the municipal unit of Eleftheres in the southwest of the Kavala regional unit, Greece. Population 1,222 (2011). The Olive and Oil Museum is located in the village.

Name
The Greek name of the village, Ελαιοχώρι, means village of olive trees.

See also
List of settlements in the Kavala regional unit

References

Populated places in Kavala (regional unit)